Regay is a village in Kandahar Province, in southern Afghanistan. It is a southwestern suburb of Kandahar.

See also
Kandahar Province

References

Populated places in Kandahar Province